Peter Hess (born 16 May 1946) is a German boxer. He competed in the men's lightweight event at the 1972 Summer Olympics.

References

1946 births
Living people
German male boxers
Olympic boxers of West Germany
Boxers at the 1972 Summer Olympics
Sportspeople from Cologne
Lightweight boxers